The list of shipwrecks in April 1885 includes ships sunk, foundered, grounded, or otherwise lost during April 1885.

1 April

2 April

3 April

4 April

5 April

6 April

7 April

8 April

9 April

12 April

14 April

15 April

17 April

18 April

19 April

20 April

21 April

22 April

23 April

24 April

26 April

28 April

29 April

Unknown date

References

1885-04
Maritime incidents in April 1885